Hydroxybutyraldehyde may refer to:

 3-Hydroxybutyraldehyde (acetaldol), an aldol, formally the product of the dimerization of acetaldehyde
 4-Hydroxybutyraldehyde, a chemical intermediate

See also
 Hydroxybutanal

Aldehydes
Sedatives